The Makati Coliseum is an indoor sporting arena located in Barangay Singkamas, Makati, Philippines.

Built and operated by the Makati city government, the coliseum has played host to the basketball games of the Philippine Basketball Association, the Philippine Basketball League, the Maharlika Pilipinas Basketball League, the National Collegiate Athletic Association, the UNTV Cup, the University Athletic Association of the Philippines, and the National Athletic Association of Schools, Colleges and Universities. It has also been the venue of major boxing events, as well as conventions, concerts and sports festivals. During the COVID-19 pandemic, it has also been used as a vaccination site by the city government.

References

External links
Makati official website
Makati Coliseum

Sports venues in Metro Manila
Indoor arenas in the Philippines
Basketball venues in the Philippines
Buildings and structures in Makati